Peter Pellegrini (born 6 October 1975) is a Slovak politician who served as the prime minister of Slovakia from 2018 to 2020 and Minister of Health from December 2019 to March 2020. He previously served as deputy prime minister (2016–2018) and minister for Education and Science (2014), as well as spending two years as speaker of the National Council (2014–2016). Pellegrini had been a member of Direction – Social Democracy until he left the party and founded Voice – Social Democracy in late June 2020.

Education and private career 
Pellegrini's studied at the Faculty of Economics of Matej Bel University and the Technical University of Košice, focusing on banking, investment and finance at the latter. Between 2002 and 2006, he worked as an economist and later as advisor to National Council member for Privatization and Economy Ľubomír Vážny, supported by ĽS-HZDS, SNS and Smer-SD.

Political involvement

Early functions 
In the 2006 parliamentary election, he was elected to the National Council for Direction – Social Democracy (Smer-SD). He was reelected in the 2010 and 2012 elections. Between 2012 and 3 July 2014 he was State Secretary for Finance. He later briefly became Minister for Education and Science.

Speaker of the National Council 
On 25 November 2014, he was elected Speaker of the National Council, succeeding Pavol Paška. In 2015, he was appointed Digital Champion of Slovakia, a European Union appointed position to promote the benefits of an inclusive digital society.

Prime Minister of Slovakia 

Made Deputy Prime Minister for Investments in 2016, under Prime Minister Robert Fico, Pellegrini was sworn in as head of government after his predecessor resigned on 15 March 2018 in the wake of the murder of journalist Ján Kuciak. President Andrej Kiska approved of Pellegrini's Cabinet on 21 March 2018; 81 members of the National Council voted in favour of approving the cabinet the next week.

After serving as Acting Interior Minister in April 2018, Pellegrini temporarily took on the role of Finance Minister when Peter Kažimír left to become Governor of the National Bank of Slovakia in 2019.

Later, in December 2019, he assumed the office of Minister of Health after Andrea Kalavská resigned.

His party lost the 2020 parliamentary election to the populist, anti-corruption party Ordinary People led by Igor Matovič.

During the COVID-19 pandemic, as medical supplies began to dwindle, nations began competing for supplies outside their jurisdictions, either paying companies to reroute or seizing equipment intended for other countries. Pellegrini said he booked two million masks from Ukraine, the requirement was payment in cash. However, a German agent appeared, paid more for the masks, and bought them. Ukraine Foreign Affairs Minister Dmytro Kuleba responded to the situation by saying there was no country in Europe that would not hunt face masks and respirators around the world.

Personal life 
Pellegrini has Italian ancestors. His great-grandfather Leopoldo Pellegrini came to Austria-Hungary to participate in the construction of the railway between Levice and Zvolen.

References 

|-

|-

|-

1975 births
Living people
Direction – Social Democracy politicians
Health ministers of Slovakia
Finance ministers of Slovakia
Prime Ministers of Slovakia
Speakers of the National Council (Slovakia)
Members of the National Council (Slovakia) 2006-2010
Members of the National Council (Slovakia) 2010-2012
Members of the National Council (Slovakia) 2012-2016
Members of the National Council (Slovakia) 2020-present
Slovak people of Italian descent
Politicians from Banská Bystrica
Matej Bel University alumni
Education ministers of Slovakia